Slivice is a settlement west of Rakek in the Municipality of Cerknica in the Inner Carniola region of Slovenia.

References

External links

Slivice on Geopedia

Populated places in the Municipality of Cerknica